Danny Brabham (February 25, 1941 – January 22, 2011) was an American football player who played collegiately at linebacker for the University of Arkansas, and for six seasons in the American Football League (AFL) for the Houston Oilers and the Cincinnati Bengals.

Brabham died in his home in Prairieville, Louisiana, on January 22, 2011.

See also
 List of American Football League players

References

1941 births
2011 deaths
American football linebackers
Houston Oilers players
Cincinnati Bengals players
Arkansas Razorbacks football players
People from Prairieville, Louisiana
People from Magnolia, Mississippi
American Football League players